Mohammad Ghorbani may refer to:
 Mohammad Ghorbani (wrestler)
 Mohammad Ghorbani (footballer)